We House Slaves (Swedish: Vi hemslavinnor) is a 1942 Swedish comedy film directed by Schamyl Bauman and starring Dagmar Ebbesen, John Botvid and Ernst Eklund. It was shot at the Centrumateljéerna Studios in Stockholm. The film's sets were designed by the art director Bibi Lindström. It was a remake of the 1933 film House Slaves, with Ebbesen reprising her role from the earlier film.

Cast
 Dagmar Ebbesen as 	Kristiana Falk
 John Botvid as Johan Blomqwist
 Ernst Eklund as 	Teodor Larsson
 Hjördis Petterson as 	Laura Larsson 
 Karl-Arne Holmsten as 	Gunnar Andersson
 Maj-Britt Håkansson as 	Ingrid Larsson
 Kaj Hjelm as 	Palle Larsson
 Dagmar Olsson as 	Gullan, House-maid
 Carl-Gunnar Wingård as 	Calle Bergman
 Anna-Lisa Baude as 	Anna Bergman
 Julia Cæsar as 	Hanna 
 Åke Engfeldt as 	Kadett Furustubbe
 Einar Axelsson as Baron Wolfgang
 Bengt Ekerot as Linus Tallhagen
 Bellan Roos as Springflicka
 Margit Andelius as 	Mrs. Karlsson
 Helga Brofeldt as 	Amanda
 Sickan Castegren as 	Guest 
 Georg Fernqvist as 	Larssons Kamrer 
 Jan-Erik Lindqvist as 	Kadett Hare 
 Sten Mattsson as 	Varubud 
 Mimi Pollak as 	Mrs. Rose Réenchrona 
 Olav Riégo as 	Kristiana's Lawyer 
 Lisa Wirström as Städerska

References

Bibliography 
 Per Olov Qvist & Peter von Bagh. Guide to the Cinema of Sweden and Finland. Greenwood Publishing Group, 2000.

External links 
 

1942 films
1942 comedy films
Swedish comedy films
1940s Swedish-language films
Films directed by Schamyl Bauman
1940s Swedish films